Five grains or Five Grains may refer to:
List of Five grains in world culture
Five Grains, or granular foods (Wu gu) of Chinese and related culture